GP Slovenian Istria (formerly known as GP Izola) is a men's one-day cycle race that takes place in Slovenia and is rated by the UCI as 1.2 and forms part of the UCI Europe Tour.

Winners

Winners per nation

References

Cycle races in Slovenia
Winter events in Slovenia